The 2010 Six Nations Championship, known as the 2010 RBS 6 Nations due to sponsorship by the Royal Bank of Scotland, was the 11th series of the Six Nations Championship and the 116th international championship, an annual rugby union competition between the six major European national teams. The tournament was held between 6 February and 20 March 2010.

The championship was contested by England, France, Ireland, Italy, Scotland and Wales. France won the tournament, achieving a final 12–10 victory over England to win the Grand Slam, their first since 2004 and ninth overall (including six in the Five Nations). This was also their 17th outright victory, including 12 victories in the Five Nations, excluding eight titles shared with other countries. France also retained the Giuseppe Garibaldi Trophy by defeating Italy in the tournament, to whom they had (then) never lost within the Six Nations.

Ireland, 2009 Grand Slam winners, came second with three victories and two defeats. Despite defeating England and Wales, Ireland failed to win the Triple Crown after a 23–20 defeat to Scotland in their final match. England and Wales came third and fourth respectively with two victories each, while Scotland and Italy finished in fifth and sixth positions for the third tournament in a row. Both teams achieved just one victory each, with Scotland also recording a draw in the Calcutta Cup match against England to place ahead of Italy.

Summary

The reigning champions on entering the tournament were Ireland, who won the Grand Slam and Triple Crown in 2009.

Ireland did not win the Triple Crown in 2010 due to a surprise 23–20 loss to Scotland in the final Six Nations match at Croke Park on 20 March, with Scotland avoiding their third "wooden spoon" since 2004 in the process. Brian O'Driscoll had opened the scoring in the 11th minute and Ireland were level with Scotland in the 64th minute after Tommy Bowe scored a try, with substitute Ronan O'Gara converting. Scotland's Johnnie Beattie scored his team's first try since they played Wales in their second game and Dan Parks scored a penalty in the final minute to prevent Ireland winning the Triple Crown. Ireland coach Declan Kidney described it as "not our greatest day".

Ireland's previous match – a 27–12 victory over Wales on 13 March – had seen O'Driscoll achieve 100 caps for his country. Ireland's previous match against England had seen John Hayes achieve 100 caps for his country, the first player to do so for Ireland.

Ireland's loss to Scotland meant France had won the Championship but could still achieve the Grand Slam by beating England in their final game at the Stade de France on 20 March. The Grand Slam was achieved by France following a 12–10 victory in this game. It was France's first Grand Slam since 2004. England scored the only try of the game. Jonny Wilkinson was not included in the England starting team for only the third time in his career. Bryce Lawrence from New Zealand refereed the game.

The nominations for "Player of the Championship" were announced on 17 March; these were Tommy Bowe (Ireland), Mathieu Bastareaud, Morgan Parra, Thierry Dusautoir, Imanol Harinordoquy (all France) and Shane Williams (Wales). Ireland captain Brian O'Driscoll, who had won the award in three of the four previous seasons, was not included this time. Tommy Bowe was named as the player of the championship on 25 March, having polled nearly 50% of the fan votes.

Participants
The teams involved were:

Squads

Table

Results
The schedule for the 2010 Championship was released on 2 April 2009. Following the success of the tournament's first Friday night game, between France and Wales in the 2009 Championship, the organisers scheduled the reverse fixture to also be played on a Friday night.

'c' and 'm' following a try denote 'converted' and 'missed conversion' respectively.

Round 1

England wore a special kit to celebrate the centenary of the first international match – England vs Wales – at Twickenham Stadium.
Dan Cole (England) made his international debut.

Luc Ducalcon (France) made his international debut.

Round 2

Chris Paterson became the 13th player in history with at least 100 international appearances. His missed conversion ended a personal streak of 35 consecutive successful kicks at goal in the Six Nations, dating back to 2007. 

Jonny Wilkinson's two missed penalties ended a personal streak of consecutive successful penalty kicks in any international which he has started, dating back to 2003.
Matt Mullan (England) made his international debut.

Round 3

Notes:
Marc Andreu (France) made his international debut.

John Hayes became the first Irish player to earn 100 international caps.

Round 4

Brian O'Driscoll became the second Irishman to reach 100 caps for his country.

Ben Youngs (England) made his international debut.

Round 5

Chris Ashton (England) made his international debut.

Top scorers

Try scorers

Points scorers

References

External links
Official site
2010 Six Nations Championship Coverage at the Guardian

 
2010 rugby union tournaments for national teams
2010
2009–10 in European rugby union
2009–10 in Irish rugby union
2009–10 in English rugby union
2009–10 in Welsh rugby union
2009–10 in Scottish rugby union
2009–10 in French rugby union
2009–10 in Italian rugby union
February 2010 sports events in Europe
March 2010 sports events in Europe
Royal Bank of Scotland